Dehong Dai may refer to:
Dehong Dai and Jingpo Autonomous Prefecture.
Tai Nüa language, also Dehong Dai and Chinese Shan, a language of those Dai people living in the Dehong Dai and Jingpo Autonomous Prefecture, and the Shan in Myanmar.
Tai Nua people
Tai Le script, used for the Tai Nüa language.